Lights of London is a 1914 British silent drama film directed by Bert Haldane and starring Arthur Chesney, Phyllis Relph and Fred Paul. The film is based on the 1881 stage melodrama The Lights o' London by George Sims and was made at Ealing Studios. The play was again turned into a silent film in 1923.

Cast
 Arthur Chesney as Harold Armytage
 Phyllis Relph as Hetty Preene
 Fred Paul as Clifford Armytage
 Thomas H. MacDonald
 J. Hastings Batson
 Roy Travers
 Rolf Leslie

Bibliography
 Low, Rachael. History of the British Film, 1914-1918. Routledge, 2005.

External links

1914 films
1914 drama films
British drama films
Films directed by Bert Haldane
British silent feature films
British films based on plays
Films set in London
Ealing Studios films
British black-and-white films
1910s English-language films
1910s British films
Silent drama films